Richard Crawshaw, Baron Crawshaw of Aintree, OBE (25 September 1917 – 16 July 1986) was elected as a British Labour Party Member of Parliament in 1964 but joined the Social Democratic Party (SDP) in 1981.

Early life
Crawshaw was born in Salford, the son of Percy Crawshaw and Beatrice (née Barrett). He attended Pendleton Grammar School, before leaving to train as an engineer at the age of 16. Prior to World War II he had been a theological student, but soon after its outbreak he enlisted in the Royal Artillery and Parachute Regiment. Upon demobilisation he matriculated as an undergraduate at Pembroke College, Cambridge, taking a special two-year 'war degree'. He then studied at the University of London for a Bachelor of Laws (LLB) degree, and took his pupillage at the Inner Temple. In 1948 he was called to the bar, serving on the Northern Circuit.

Politics
Crawshaw became active in Liverpool politics after the war, representing the Dingle ward on Liverpool Borough Council from 1948. His council ward was very safe for the Labour Party, although the constituency that it was situated in – Liverpool Toxteth – was a marginal seat for the Conservatives from its creation in 1950. He campaigned for issues such as better standard of council housing and state schools.

Crawshaw was elected as MP for Liverpool Toxteth in 1964, beating the sitting Conservative Reginald Bevins by 2,784 votes. In parliament he was a strong supporter of the Territorial Army, and on one occasion voted against the annual Defence Estimates because they failed to make a large enough provision for it. He was reported to have been a very diligent MP, who called on constituents' homes in several streets each week, often to the surprise of the residents.

In March 1981 Crawshaw was one of the initial group of 13 Labour MPs who founded the SDP. Unlike the other defectors, his participation was considered "something of a surprise to journalists." After Liverpool Toxteth was abolished he stood in 1983 for the new constituency of Liverpool Broadgreen, which did not contain any part of his former seat. Notionally a safe Labour constituency, Crawshaw's candidacy was further complicated by the existence of an Independent Liberal on the ballot. He received 5,169 votes (11.24%), but was beaten into last place. Crawshaw was created a life peer as Baron Crawshaw of Aintree, of Salford in the County of Greater Manchester on 17 May 1985.

Personal life
Crawshaw married Audrey Lima in 1960; they had no children. He listed his hobbies in Who's Who as "Climbing, walking, free fall parachuting and youth activities", and in 1974 set a world record by walking 231 miles non-stop, raising thousands of pounds on behalf of the National Society for the Prevention of Cruelty to Children.

Crawshaw lived for most of his life in Aintree, a very safe Conservative area in the Ormskirk constituency. During his time in Parliament he lived in Chelsea with fellow Labour MP James Dunn.

References

1917 births
1986 deaths
Alumni of Pembroke College, Cambridge
Councillors in Liverpool
Labour Party (UK) MPs for English constituencies
Social Democratic Party (UK) MPs for English constituencies
Crawshaw of Aintree
Officers of the Order of the British Empire
UK MPs 1964–1966
UK MPs 1966–1970
UK MPs 1970–1974
UK MPs 1974
UK MPs 1974–1979
UK MPs 1979–1983
Members of the Parliament of the United Kingdom for Liverpool constituencies
Life peers created by Elizabeth II